Yujiazui is a small town in the north west Hunan province of China.

References

Towns of Hunan